Andrzej Tkocz (born 28 September 1951) is a former international speedway rider from Poland.

Speedway career 
Tkocz won a bronze medal at the Speedway World Team Cup in the 1974 Speedway World Team Cup.

He rode in the top tier of British Speedway from 1978 to 1979, riding for Poole Pirates.

World final appearances

World Team Cup
 1974 -  Chorzów, Silesian Stadium (with Zenon Plech / Jan Mucha / Andrzej Jurczyński / Jerzy Szczakiel) - 3rd - 13pt (2) 
 1979 –  London, White City Stadium (with Piotr Pyszny / Robert Słaboń / Marek Cieślak / Zenon Plech) – 4th – 11pts (0)

Family
His older brothers Stanisław Tkocz and Jan Tkocz were both speedway riders.

References 

1951 births
Polish speedway riders
Poole Pirates riders
Living people
People from Rybnik